Sammy Davis Jr. Belts the Best of Broadway is a 1962 studio album by Sammy Davis Jr., arranged by Marty Paich.

Track listing
 "Too Close for Comfort" (Jerry Bock, George David Weiss, Larry Holofcener) - 3:01
 "My Romance" (Richard Rodgers, Lorenz Hart) - 3:30
 "We Kiss In a Shadow" (Rodgers, Oscar Hammerstein II) - 3:18
 "Two Ladies in De Shade of De Banana Tree" (Harold Arlen, Truman Capote)- 2:57
 "Lost in the Stars" (Kurt Weill, Maxwell Anderson) - 4:25
 "Falling in Love with Love" (Rodgers, Hart) - 2:25	
 "Climb Ev'ry Mountain" (Rodgers, Hammerstein) - 3:17
 "Something's Coming" (Leonard Bernstein, Stephen Sondheim) - 2:43
 "That-Great-Come-and-Get-it-Day" (Burton Lane, Yip Harburg) - 2:41
 "If I Loved You" (Rodgers, Hammerstein) - 3:55
 "A Lot of Livin' to Do" (Charles Strouse, Lee Adams) - 2:43
 "There is Nothing Like a Dame" (Rodgers, Hammerstein) - 2:36

Personnel 
 Sammy Davis Jr. – vocals
 Marty Paich – arranger

References

1962 albums
Sammy Davis Jr. albums
Albums arranged by Marty Paich
Reprise Records albums
Albums produced by Jimmy Bowen
Covers albums